Woodchurch may refer to the following places in England:

 Woodchurch, Kent, Ashford
 Woodchurch, a hamlet in Manston, Thanet
 Woodchurch, Merseyside
 Woodchurch railway station, a proposed station
 Woodchurch High School